Margaret Davies or Marged Dafydd (c. 1700–1778 or 1785) was a Welsh poet, scribe and manuscript collector. Her work led to the survival of many printed and handwritten poems in Welsh, which she wrote into her manuscripts. Several of these and the names and identities of their writers have survived only in her copies.

Early life
Davies was born in Coetgae-du, near Trawsfynydd in north-west Wales.

Career
Davies was one several north-western Welsh women poets, including Margaret Rowlands and Alis ach Wiliam, who travelled to meet with each other and trade poems. Like the pioneering poet Angharad James, born in the previous generation, those in this informal group were relatively privileged economically, with money and leisure time to make poetry writing and travel feasible. In addition to her contacts in Snowdonia, Davies also corresponded with male poets of the London Celticism movement. No poems of hers were published in her lifetime.

Davies spent much of her time collecting and copying printed and handwritten Welsh poems into manuscript compilations. Half a dozen women poets are represented, with some poems surviving only in Davies's copies. For example, the compilations are the only known source for one of the englynion written by a medieval Welsh woman poet, Gwerful Mechain. Likewise, much surviving information on Angharad James, including the one known copy of James's elegy on her son's death, comes from Davies.

According to the literary scholar Ceridwen Lloyd-Morgan, "The importance of [Davies's] contribution... cannot be over-emphasised: without her efforts in collecting and writing down poems by other women, both of her day and earlier, a significant number of poems, and even the names of the women who composed them, would be completely unknown to us today."

Death and manuscript survival
Davies died in 1778 or 1785.

Five manuscripts wholly in Davies's handwriting and three others to which she contributed are known to survive. Some are held in the Cwrtmawr Manuscripts collection at the National Library of Wales.

References

1700s births
18th-century deaths
18th-century Welsh poets
18th-century Welsh women writers
Welsh-language poets
Welsh women poets
People from Trawsfynydd
Year of death uncertain
British scribes
Welsh book and manuscript collectors